John Anton from Newark, California is a retired American soccer forward who played professionally in the North American Soccer League.

After playing fours years of high school soccer at Newark High School under Frank Mangiola, Anton attended the University of San Francisco, playing on the men's soccer team from 1973 to 1977.  In 1979, he signed with the Edmonton Drillers of the North American Soccer League.  He may have played for the San Diego Sockers in 1980.

John currently resides in Novato, California with his wife and kids, where he coaches youth soccer.

References
 John Anton also played professionally for the Golden Gate Gales of the ASL 
Also played for the USA Olympic Soccer Team 1976-77 Coach: Walt Chyzowych
John Anton was inducted into the USF Athletic Hall of Fame for Soccer in 1997
Drafted out of college 1977 to the San Jose Earthquakes 
1979 Signed with the Oakland Stompers NASL which became the Edmonton Drillers of Alberta Canada

External links
 NASL stats

1955 births
Living people
American soccer players
American expatriate soccer players
American expatriate sportspeople in Canada
American Soccer League (1933–1983) players
Edmonton Drillers (1979–1982) players
North American Soccer League (1968–1984) players
San Francisco Dons men's soccer players
San Diego Sockers (NASL) players
Expatriate soccer players in Canada
Soccer players from California
Association football midfielders